Prosperity is a 1932 American pre-Code comedy-drama film starring Marie Dressler and Polly Moran. The two leading actresses play longtime matriarchal ladies comically sparring off each other, and trying to control their intertwined lives.

Plot
Maggie Warren (Dressler) inherited a family bank during the Depression and Lizzie Praskins (Moran) is one of her biggest depositors. Maggie’s son John is engaged to Lizzies's daughter Helen.  All kinds of farces happen when the would-be mothers-in-law battle for setting the wedding's protocol including their different preferences of choosing the pastor to perform the ceremony.

As the story goes on, Lizzie has a panic attack based on rumors about the bank going to belly-up. She hysterically withdraws all her money causing all other customers in the bank to panic and they in return take out their money.  The Warren family  bank is forced to close.  Maggie’s naive son gets swindled out of his mother’s bonds. As farces go, at the end the swindlers are caught and Maggie’s matriarchal resourcefulness with her wised-up son gets the bank solvent again, and the two matriarchal families are bonded with mirthful resolutions.

Cast
 Marie Dressler as Maggie Warren
 Polly Moran as Lizzie Praskins
 Anita Page as Helen Praskin
 Norman Foster as John Warren
 Jacquie Lyn as Cissy
 Jerry Tucker as Buster
 Charles Giblyn as Mayor
 Frank Darien as Ezra Higgins
 Henry Holland as John Roche

Box office
According to MGM records the film earned $1,166,000 in the US and Canada and $348,000 elsewhere resulting in a profit of $378,000.

References

External links
 
 
 
 

1932 films
1932 comedy-drama films
American black-and-white films
American comedy-drama films
Films directed by Sam Wood
Metro-Goldwyn-Mayer films
1930s English-language films
1930s American films